Idhar Udhar is a Hindi sitcom which first aired on Doordarshan in 1985. It was directed by Anand Mahendroo and produced by Shobha Doctor. It starred real-life sisters Ratna Pathak and Supriya Pathak. Its first season was taken off the air after 12 episodes.

In December 1997, owing to the success of Dekh Bhai Dekh, Anand Mahendroo launched a sequel to the series under the banner of Advance Entertainment Network Ltd. with the original star cast of both Pathak sisters and Liliput, along with Bhavana Balsavar.

Plot

Season 1 (1985) 
The story revolves around the lives of Sunita (Ratna Pathak), an air hostess and Poonam (Supriya Pathak), an ad. executive. They stay together as paying guests in a flat in Mumbai. Their lives take an interesting turn when they end up sharing their flat with Kumar Bhairav (Ravi Baswani), a struggling actor and Sudhir (M.M. Faruqui (Lilliput)), a small-time broker.

Season 1 focuses on all the problems and joys they experience living in the same house.

Season 2 (1998) 
13 years later, Sunita (Ratna Pathak) and Poonam (Supriya Pathak / Lillete Dubey) return to Mumbai and end up sharing the same apartment exactly the way they used to. They are allotted the same apartment by their old friend Sudhir's (Liliput) mischievous adopted sons Jai and Harsh. Sudhir is now a filthy rich builder and married to his ex-secretary Katie (Bhavana Balsavar).

Season 2 peeks into the lives of Sunita, Poonam, Sudhir, Katie and their kids.

Cast 
Season 1
 Ratna Pathak as Sunita 
 Supriya Pathak as Poonam
 Lilliput as Sudhir
 Bhavana Balsavar as Kaitey (season 2)
 Ravi Baswani as Kumar Bhairav(alias)/Asif Mohammad Khan(real name)/Ronnie Gonsalves(imposter)
 Shammi as Mrs. Bregenza
 Dina Pathak as Poonam's Nani
 Nisha Singh as Shabnam
 Guddi Maruti as Moti Shabnam
 Tom Alter as Ronnie Gonsalves(real)
 Prabhat Bhattacharya as Jai (season 2)
 Ajay Padhye / Rakesh Paul as Harsh (season 2)
 Aditya Kapadia as Akhil (season 2)
 Abhishek Sharma as Atul (season 2)
 Shruti Sharma as Himani (season 2)
 Tanvi Bhatia as Shivani (season 2)
 Ananya Khare as Mary (season 2)
 Parvin Dabas as Vishal, Poonam's husband (season 2)
 Amita Nangia as Kiran (season 2)
 Viju Khote
 Paintal (season 2)
 Deepak Tijori as stranger in episode 8

References

External links
 Idhar Udhar on IMDb

Indian comedy television series
Indian television sitcoms
DD National original programming
1980s Indian television series
1985 Indian television series debuts
1998 Indian television series endings